Michael J. Pilat (born July 29, 1975), known as Mike Pilot and "Tha Mike", is an American broadcaster. He is the creator and co-host of the iTunes-distributed Full Of Sith Star Wars Podcast, along with Bryan Young and Bobby Roberts.

Pilot started his podcasting career in 2006 with The Awful Show podcast (2006–2009). Three years and almost four million downloaded shows later, he then retired from The Awful Show and became the co-host for The Mediocre Show, along with Eric Tomorrow. That same month and year (June 2009), Pilot created the Obviously Oblivious podcast.

Early life
Mike Pilot was born into an Italian-American family in Reading, Pennsylvania. The only son and second oldest child of five children born to Jan and BonnieSue’s (Leonardo), Pilot joked many times that his four sisters, Brandy, Bonnie, Samantha and Kyrie, taught him how to treat a lady by their teaming up and physically beating on him. His father, Jan, worked as a steelworker and power coating operator, and his mother BonnieSue stayed home and raised the children until going back to get her degree in Child Services. Pilot graduated from Reading High School.

Career
After moving out of his parents' home in his early-twenties, Pilot worked as a steelworker to support himself and by coincidence broke his way into broadcasting by chance thru a friend of a friend who was the 7:00 to midnight DJ at then York, Pennsylvania 105.7 WQXA-FM Top 40 station. Pilot was told to come in and make an air check tape which he did that was then passed along to the station's program director.

Shortly after making the tape Pilot met with the program director and was offered a job on the sister AM station to gain experience by working as a board op during Philadelphia Phillies games. Pilot has said that it was a very weak AM station and he grew bored of the job quickly and decided to do the play-by-play for the games with his unique sense of humor. A week later, the FM station was bought out by Citadel Broadcasting and was changed to Alternative Rock 105.7 the Edge (which eventually became the X) and the majority of the DJ’s quit on the spot.

After sustaining injuries in a car accident, Pilot learned the basics of web development and design from friends and eventually became al webmaster. Pilot worked freelance for over a year until he accepted his first job as a web developer in 1999.

In March 2014 Pilot left The Mediocre Show but continues to do Full of Sith and Obviously Oblivious on a weekly basis.

On October 10, 2014 Pilot received an Honorary Induction to the Empire City Garrison of the 501 Legion.

Personal life
On September 22, 2001, Pilot married his first wife. He filed for divorce in September 2003 which was finalized in mid 2004.

In January 2005 Pilot proposed to his high school sweetheart Ariana Arndt on her birthday. They were married in a small, romantic ceremony on September 9, 2005 and their daughter Anyah was born on October 4, 2005. They live in Cumru Township, Berks County, Pennsylvania.

Internet radio
 June 2006 till May 2009 – The Awful Show (live broadcast on Cringe Humor Radio and then available on iTunes as a podcast)

Podcasting

Oblivious Notable guests on Obviously Oblivious, which began in June 2009, have included Neil deGrasse Tyson.

Notable guests on Full Of Sith, which began in January 2012, include Steve Sansweet, James Arnold Taylor, Dan Fogler, Orlando Jones, Sam Witwer, Ashley Eckstein and Catherine Taber.

Broadcast radio
May 1996 till January 1999 – 105.7 the Edge (X) WQXA-FM in York, Harrisburg and Lancaster, Pennsylvania.

References
 Full Of Sith mentioned on VodafoneUK's blog for May the Fourth
 Full Of Sith listed as a StarWars.com Featured Podcast
 Cumru man and 'Star Wars' are like peas in a podcast
 Interview on National Public Radio's (NPR) All Things Considered
 Interview on WMAY's Mike and Molson
 Behind Star Wars Celebration Anaheim's Podcast Stage
 StarWars.com Blog – Fully Operational Fandom: Podcasting Across the Galaxy, Part 2
 Podcast wield the force behind Star Wars fandom
 3 First Wave Podcasts You Really Should Be Listening To
 Quickfire Questions With Tha Mike Pilot
 Sunday Feature: An interview with Tha Mike Pilot from Full of Sith
 Star Wars – Full Of Sith
 City Weekly – Obviously Oblivious
 Slug Magazine – The Mediocre Show
 Travis Beacham, Pacific Rim Screenwriter, Talks Star Wars
 Full Of Sith Podcast Review
 Hayden Planetarium, Neil deGrasse Tyson, Obviously Oblivious

External links

 
 Full Of Sith
 Obviously Oblivious
 Mediocre Show

1975 births
Living people
American podcasters